Max Green may refer to:

 Max Green (lawyer) (1952–1998), Australian lawyer
 Max Green (musician) (born 1984), American musician
 Max Green (rugby union) (born 1996), rugby union player